Antonio Burks (born 30 May 1982) is an American professional basketball player who played for the Saint John Mill Rats of the National Basketball League of Canada. He was born in Texarkana, Arkansas. Burks is a 6'5" (1.96 m) and 220 lb (100 kg) guard-forward. Member of Omega Psi Phi. Burks now is a coach and assistant principal for the Rice Independent School District in Rice, Texas.

College career
Burks played at Arkansas High School, Jacksonville College, Moberly Area Community College and Stephen F. Austin State University.

A highlight of Burks's college career came on February 25, 2004, when as a member of the Stephen F. Austin Lumberjacks, he scored 35 points, including 7 three-pointers, to go along with 12 rebounds in a 63–60 win over Lamar University.

College statistics

|-
| style="text-align:left;"| 2002–03
| style="text-align:left;"| SFA
| 28 ||3  ||18.8  || .490 || .429 || .550|| 3.46 ||1.00  || 0.46|| 0.04 || 9.14
|-
| style="text-align:left;"| 2003–04
| style="text-align:left;"| SFA
| 30 ||30  ||30.1  || .493 || .476 || .756|| 4.53 ||1.37  || 0.50|| 0.13 || 15.30
|-
|- class="sortbottom"
! style="text-align:center;" colspan=2|  Career

!58 ||33 || 24.6 ||.492  || .459 ||.689  || 4.02 ||1.19 || 0.48 ||0.09  || 12.33
|-

Professional career
Burks was the first player ever that Vermont Frost Heaves signed. He was re-signed by the team on August 21, 2007. He also played professionally in Norway.

On November 27, 2011, it was announced that the Saint John Mill Rats of the National Basketball League of Canada had signed Burks to their active roster.

Career statistics

Regular season 

|-
| align="left" | 2008–09
| align="left" | Niigata
|32 ||27 || 24.7 ||.412  || .384 ||.700  || 4.6 || 1.6 || 0.6 ||0.2  ||13.0 
|-
| align="left" | 2009–10
| align="left" | Niigata
|52 ||39 || 25.7 ||.422  || .399 ||.734  || 6.2 || 1.9 || 1.1 ||0.3  ||13.1
|-
| align="left" | 2010–11
| align="left" | Akita
|47 ||11 || 21.0 ||.418  || .392 ||.694  || 3.4 || 1.3 || 0.4 ||0.1  ||10.9
|-
| align="left" | 2011–12
| align="left" | Saint John 
|30 ||2 || 19.2 ||.437  || .415 ||.625  ||2.33 || 1.60 || 0.37 ||0.07  ||8.30
|-
| align="left" | 2012–13
| align="left" | Saint John 
|43 ||8 || 19.3 ||.421  || .446 ||.682  ||2.23 || 1.09 || 0.28 ||0.14  ||9.60
|-

Playoffs 

|-
|style="text-align:left;"|2010–11
|style="text-align:left;"|Akita
| 2 ||  || 9.5 || .333 || .200 || .000 || 2.0 || 1.5 || 0.0 || 0.0 || 3.5
|-
|style="text-align:left;"|2011–12
|style="text-align:left;"|Saint John
| 2 ||   || 23.0 || .154 || .125 || .000 || 3.0 || 1.5 || 0.5 || 0.0 || 2.5
|-
|style="text-align:left;"|2012–13
|style="text-align:left;"|Saint John
| 3 ||   || 22.0 || .258 || .333 || .000 || 2.3 || 0.7 || 0.0 || 0.3 || 8.0
|-

Notes

External links
 Antonio Burks' profile at the Official Athletic Website of Stephen F. Austin State University
 usbasket.com

1982 births
Living people
African-American basketball players
Akita Northern Happinets players
American expatriate basketball people in Canada
American expatriate basketball people in Japan
American expatriate basketball people in Norway
ABA All-Star Game players
Basketball players from Arkansas
Niigata Albirex BB players
Moberly Greyhounds men's basketball players
People from Texarkana, Arkansas
Saint John Mill Rats players
Shooting guards
Small forwards
Stephen F. Austin Lumberjacks basketball players
American men's basketball players
21st-century African-American sportspeople
20th-century African-American people